Gershom Browne (8 August 1898 – 6 December 2000) was the last known Guyanese First World War veteran. He served in the 1st British West Indies Regiment and fought on the Western Front during the war. He died on 6 December 2000 at the age of 102.

See also 
 List of last surviving World War I veterans by country

References
ar article mentioning Browne

1898 births
2000 deaths
Guyanese military personnel
British Army personnel of World War I
Guyanese centenarians
British West Indies Regiment soldiers
Men centenarians